Charles Knickerbocker Harley is an academic economic historian who has written on a wide range of topics including the British industrial revolution, the late nineteenth century international economy, and the impact of technological change. He is a practitioner of the New Economic History.

At Harvard he studied under Alexander Gerschenkron. He completed his dissertation, Shipbuilding and Shipping in the Late Nineteenth Century, on the transition from wooden sailing ships to steel steamers, in 1972. He took a professorship at the University of British Columbia. In 1978 he moved to the University of Western Ontario. In 2005 he joined the faculty of St. Antony's College, Oxford, where he stayed until becoming an Emeritus Fellow in 2011.

He has been a frequent collaborator with N.F.R. Crafts.

He has been awarded The Cliometric Society's Clio Can in 1999 in recognition of his exceptional support of cliometrics and the Arthur H. Cole Prize by the Journal of Economic History, for his essay, "British Industrialization Before 1841: Evidence of Slower Growth During the Industrial Revolution".

Selected publications
 
 
 
 
 
 
 
 
 
 
 
 
 
 
 
 
 
 
 
 
 Harley, C. Knick (April 2013). Slavery, the British Atlantic Economy and the Industrial Revolution. University of Oxford, Discussion Papers in Economic and Social History. Number 113.

References

Living people
1943 births
Economic historians
Harvard University alumni
Academic staff of the University of Western Ontario
Fellows of St Antony's College, Oxford